Aisha Muharrar (born March 12, 1984) is an American television writer and author of the book More Than a Label .

Early life
Muharrar graduated from Harvard University with a degree in English and American Literature and Language and was the Vice President of the Harvard Lampoon humor magazine. She is a native of Bay Shore, New York.

Career
She was a writer for NBC's Parks and Recreation created by Greg Daniels and Michael Schur. Previously, she was a staff writer for Fox's animated comedy Sit Down, Shut Up, created by Mitch Hurwitz.

Filmography

Television

References

Living people
1984 births
The Harvard Lampoon alumni
American television writers
American comedy writers
American women television writers
People from Bay Shore, New York
Screenwriters from New York (state)
21st-century American women